Linda Louise Craft (1939-1993) was an American golfer.

Biography
Linda Louise Craft was born in Jacksboro, Texas in 1939. She attended Louisiana State University to study clinical psychology.

Craft started playing golf when she was twenty-six years old. During her career, she toured with Ladies Professional Golf Association and founded a golf school, Craft-Zavichas Golf School.

In 1993, Craft was included in the Texas Women's Hall of Fame.

Awards
 Ben Hogan Award
 Governor's Victory Award
 LPGA Ellen Griffin Rolex Award
 American Cancer Society Award

References

1939 births
1993 deaths
American female golfers